In abstract algebra, a discrete valuation ring (DVR) is a principal ideal domain (PID) with exactly one non-zero maximal ideal.

This means a DVR is an integral domain R which satisfies any one of the following equivalent conditions:

 R is a local principal ideal domain, and not a field.
 R is a valuation ring with a value group isomorphic to the integers under addition.
 R is a local Dedekind domain and not a field.
 R is a Noetherian local domain whose maximal ideal is principal, and not a field.
 R is an integrally closed Noetherian local ring with Krull dimension one.
 R is a principal ideal domain with a unique non-zero prime ideal.
 R is a principal ideal domain with a unique irreducible element (up to multiplication by units).
 R is a unique factorization domain with a unique irreducible element (up to multiplication by units).
 R is Noetherian, not a field, and every nonzero fractional ideal of R is irreducible in the sense that it cannot be written as a finite intersection of fractional ideals properly containing it.
 There is some discrete valuation ν on the field of fractions K of R such that R = {0}  {x  K : ν(x) ≥ 0}.

Examples

Algebraic

Localization of Dedekind rings 
Let . In this case, we define ν(r)=k.
Then  is the discrete valuation ring corresponding to ν. , and the "unique" irreducible element (up to units) is 2 (this is also known as a uniformizing parameter). Note that  is the localization of the Dedekind domain  at the prime ideal generated by 2.

More generally, any localization of a Dedekind domain at a non-zero prime ideal is a discrete valuation ring; in practice, this is frequently how discrete valuation rings arise. In particular, we can define rings

for any prime p in complete analogy.

p-adic integers 
The ring  of p-adic integers is a DVR, for any prime . Here  is an irreducible element; the valuation assigns to each -adic integer  the largest integer  such that  divides .

Formal power series 
Another important example of a DVR is the ring of formal power series  in one variable  over some field .

If we restrict ourselves to real or complex coefficients, we can consider the ring of power series in one variable that converge in a neighborhood of 0 (with the neighborhood depending on the power series). This is a discrete valuation ring. This is useful for building intuition with the Valuative criterion of properness.

Ring in function field 
For an example more geometrical in nature, take the ring R = {f/g : f, g polynomials in R[X]  and g(0) ≠ 0}, considered as a subring of the field of rational functions R(X) in the variable X. R can be identified with the ring of all real-valued rational functions defined (i.e. finite) in a neighborhood of 0 on the real axis (with the neighborhood depending on the function). It is a discrete valuation ring; the "unique" irreducible element is X and the valuation assigns to each function f the order (possibly 0) of the zero of f at 0. This example provides the template for studying general algebraic curves near non-singular points, the algebraic curve in this case being the real line.

Scheme-theoretic

Henselian trait 
Sometimes this is denoted as

Localization of a point on a curve 
Given an algebraic curve , the local ring  at a smooth point  is a discrete valuation ring, because it is a principal valuation ring.

Uniformizing parameter
Given a DVR R, any irreducible element of R is a generator for the unique maximal ideal of R and vice versa. Such an element is also called a uniformizing parameter of R (or a uniformizing element, a uniformizer, or a prime element).

If we fix a uniformizing parameter t, then M=(t) is the unique maximal ideal of R, and every other non-zero ideal is a power of M, i.e. has the form (t k) for some k≥0. All the powers of t are distinct, and so are the powers of M. Every non-zero element x of R can be written in the form αt k with α a unit in R and k≥0, both uniquely determined by x. The valuation is given by ν(x) = kv(t). So to understand the ring completely, one needs to know the group of units of R and how the units interact additively with the powers of t.

The function v also makes any discrete valuation ring into a Euclidean domain.

Topology 
Every discrete valuation ring, being a local ring, carries a natural topology and is a topological ring. We can also give it a metric space structure where the distance between two elements x and y can be measured as follows:

(or with any other fixed real number > 1 in place of 2). Intuitively: an element z is "small" and "close to 0" iff its valuation ν(z) is large. The function |x-y|, supplemented by |0|=0, is the restriction of an absolute value defined on the field of fractions of the discrete valuation ring.

A DVR is compact if and only if it is complete and its residue field R/M is a finite field.

Examples of complete DVRs include
 the ring of p-adic integers and 
 the ring of formal power series over any field
For a given DVR, one often passes to its completion, a complete DVR containing the given ring that is often easier to study. This completion procedure can be thought of in a geometrical way as passing from rational functions to power series, or from rational numbers to the reals.

Returning to our examples: the ring of all formal power series in one variable with real coefficients is the completion of the ring of rational functions defined (i.e. finite) in a neighborhood of 0 on the real line; it is also the completion of the ring of all real power series that converge near 0.

See also
 :Category:Localization (mathematics)
 Local ring
Ramification of local fields
 Cohen ring
 Valuation ring

References

 
 
Discrete valuation ring, The Encyclopaedia of Mathematics.

Commutative algebra
Localization (mathematics)